Keith Barker is a Canadian playwright and theatre director. The current artistic director of the Native Earth Performing Arts theatre company, he is most noted for his plays The Hours That Remain, an exploration of missing and murdered Indigenous women, and This Is How We Got Here, a play about youth suicide which was a shortlisted finalist for the Governor General's Award for English-language drama at the 2018 Governor General's Awards.

A member of the Métis Nation of Ontario, he grew up in Northwestern Ontario, Barker is a graduate of the theatre program at George Brown College.

References

21st-century Canadian dramatists and playwrights
21st-century Canadian male actors
21st-century Canadian male writers
Canadian male dramatists and playwrights
Canadian male stage actors
Canadian theatre directors
Métis writers
George Brown College alumni
First Nations dramatists and playwrights
Living people
Year of birth missing (living people)
Canadian artistic directors